William Denman (November 7, 1872 – March 9, 1959) was a United States circuit judge of the United States Court of Appeals for the Ninth Circuit.

Education and career

Born in San Francisco, California, Denman attended Lowell High School, received a Bachelor of Letters degree from the University of California, Berkeley in 1894, and a Bachelor of Laws from Harvard Law School in 1897. He entered private practice in San Francisco in 1898, and was an assistant professor and lecturer at the University of California, Hastings College of the Law from 1902 to 1906.

Federal judicial service

On January 10, 1935, Denman was nominated by President Franklin D. Roosevelt to a seat on the United States Court of Appeals for the Ninth Circuit vacated by Judge William Ball Gilbert. Denman was confirmed by the United States Senate on January 29, 1935, and received his commission on February 1, 1935. He served as Chief Judge and as a member of the Judicial Conference of the United States from 1948 to 1957, and assumed senior status on July 3, 1957. He continued to serve in that capacity until his death on March 9, 1959.

Notable case

Denman dissented in Korematsu v. United States (9th Cir. 1943). The 9th circuit permitted the government to force Japanese Americans into internment camps, and the Supreme Court affirmed the following year.

Denman wrote: "If it be unusual for a judge of a court in which he is a participant to dissent from his associates on the matter of a certification, the occasion is even more unusual.

Under the threat of penitentiary sentences to these 70,000 American citizens who have relied on the right they believe the Constitution gives them, we are driving from their homes to internment camps, not men alone, as with the deportation of the Dutch by the Germans, but their wives and children, without giving the latter the choice to remain in their homes. We are destroying their businesses, in effect, as if such citizens were enemy aliens. The destruction of their business connections means for many that they will not be able to return to their native areas; in effect, as were the French Canadians so taken to Louisiana."

References

Sources
 
 Guide to the William Denman Papers at The Bancroft Library
 Jonathan van Harmelen. "William Denman: A Voice of Dissent on the Courts - Part 1." Discover Nikkei, June 8, 2022. http://www.discovernikkei.org/en/journal/2022/6/8/william-denman-1/
 Jonathan van Harmelen. "William Denman: A Voice of Dissent on the Courts - Part 2." Discover Nikkei, June 9, 2022. http://www.discovernikkei.org/en/journal/2022/6/9/william-denman-2/

1872 births
1959 deaths
University of California, Berkeley alumni
Harvard Law School alumni
University of California, Hastings faculty
Judges of the United States Court of Appeals for the Ninth Circuit
United States court of appeals judges appointed by Franklin D. Roosevelt
20th-century American judges